HD 13931 b (also known as HIP 10626 b) is an extrasolar planet which orbits the G-type star HD 13931, located approximately 155 light years away in the constellation Andromeda. This planet takes 11.55 years to orbit the star at the average distance of 5.15 AU or 770 Gm. The planet's eccentricity (0.02) is about the same as Earth. The orbital distance for this planet ranges from 5.05 to 5.25 AU. This planet was discovered by using radial velocity method from spectrograph taken at Keck Observatory on November 13, 2009.

In 2023, the inclination and true mass of HD 13931 b were measured via astrometry.

See also
Other planets that were discovered or confirmed on November 13, 2009:
 HD 34445 b
 HD 126614 Ab
 Gliese 179 b

References

 

Exoplanets discovered in 2009
Exoplanets detected by radial velocity
Giant planets
Andromeda (constellation)
Exoplanets detected by astrometry